The Calanshio Sand Sea (Sarīr Kalanshiyū ar Ramlī al Kabīr) is a sand desert region located in the Libyan Desert, of the Kufra District in Cyrenaica, eastern Libya. It has a surface of approximately 62,000 km². The erg extends from Jaghbub and Jalo in the north to Kufra in the south, a distance of 500km.

The erg lies parallel to the Egyptian Sand Sea and is contiguous with it at their northern ends. They contain dunes up to 110m in height: these lie in a roughly north-south direction and were created by the wind.

The Calanshio Sand Sea is the site of the missing World War II B-24 Liberator Lady Be Good. The crew bailed out believing they were over the sea, when their plane ran out of fuel, and they became lost. When they landed in the Libyan Desert they could feel a northwesterly breeze. Thinking they were near the Mediterranean, they headed into the wind hoping it would lead them to safety.

See also
Libyan Desert
Ribiana Sand Sea
Idehan Murzuq
Idehan Ubari

References

External links
"Body and wallets lie among 200-foot dunes" ("Lady Be Good in the Calanshio Sand Sea)

Dunes of Libya
Deserts of Libya
Sahara
Kufra District
Cyrenaica
Landforms of Libya
Ergs of Africa